Keiko Tanaka-Ikeda (田中-池田 敬子, born Keiko Tanaka on November 11, 1933) is the first Japanese female gymnast to win a world title, which she accomplished on the balance beam in 1954 (by becoming first Asian female gymnast who win a world gold medal). For 63 years, she remained the only Japanese female gymnast who won a world gold medal - until Mai Murakami won the floor exercise at the 2017 World Championships. Tanaka-Ikeda won seven more medals at the world championships in 1958–1966. She also competed at the 1956, 1960 and 1964 Olympics in all artistic gymnastics events and won a team bronze medal in 1964; her best individual achievement was a fourth place on the floor in 1956.

In retirement she taught at Japan's Sports Science University and served as director of the Japanese Gymnastics Association. In 2002, she became the first Japanese woman to be inducted into the International Gymnastics Hall of Fame.

References

1933 births
Living people
Japanese female artistic gymnasts
Olympic gymnasts of Japan
Gymnasts at the 1956 Summer Olympics
Gymnasts at the 1960 Summer Olympics
Gymnasts at the 1964 Summer Olympics
Olympic bronze medalists for Japan
Olympic medalists in gymnastics
Medalists at the 1964 Summer Olympics
Medalists at the World Artistic Gymnastics Championships
20th-century Japanese women